The Challenge Stakes is an Australian Turf Club Group 2 Thoroughbred horse race at weight for age for horses three years old and older, over a distance of 1000 metres at Randwick Racecourse, Sydney in March. Total prize money for the race is A$500,000.

History
The race was first run in 1906. Before 2003 the race was run in January or early February.
The track and race record was set by Redzel in 2018 in a time of 55.73 seconds.

Grade
 1906–1978 - Principal Race
 1987 onwards - Group 2

Venue
 1906–2001 - Randwick
 2002–2006 - Warwick Farm
 2007–2010 - Randwick
 2011 - Warwick Farm
 2012 - Rosehill 
 2013 - Warwick Farm
 2014 onwards - Randwick

Distance

 1906–1972 - 5 furlongs (~1000 metres)
 1973–2011 – 1000 metres
 2012 – 1100 metres
 2013 onwards – 1000 metres

Winners

 2023 - Passive Aggressive
 2022 - Eduardo
 2021 - Eduardo
 2020 - Nature Strip
 2019 - Ball Of Muscle
 2018 - Redzel
 2017 - English
 2016 - English
 2015 - Miracles Of Life
 2014 - Villa Verde
 2013 - Snitzerland
 2012 - Rain Affair
 2011 - Hay List
 2010 - De Lightning Ridge
 2009 - Olonana
 2008 - Hurried Choice
 2007 - Spark Of Life
 2006 - Snitzel
 2005 - Impaler
 2004 - Star Of Florida
 2003 - Star Of Florida
 2002 - Bomber Bill
 2001 - Pimpala Prince
 2000 - Easy Rocking
 1999 - Ab Initio
 1998 - Cangronde
 1997 - Cangronde
 1996 - Light Up The World
 1995 - Moss Rocket
 1994 - Classic Magic
 1993 - Spanish Mix
 1992 - All Archie
 1991 - Lightning Bend
 1990 - Show County
 1989 - Groucho
 1988 - Snippets
 1987 - At Sea
 1986 - At Sea
 1985 - At Sea
 1984 - Razor Sharp
 1983 - Razor Sharp
 1982   -    Razor Sharp
 1981   -    Steel Blade
 1980   -    Acamer
 1979   -    Christole
 1978   -    Monreale
 1977  -     Crimson Cloud
 1976  -     River Ridge
 1975  -     Zephyr Bay
 1974  -     War Island
 1973  -     Bounty
 1972  -     Playbill
 1971  -     Farlara
 1970  -     †Constant Rhythm / Biarritz Star 
 1969  -     Gay Gauntlet
 1968  -     Dawn Boy
 1967  -     Gay Gauntlet
 1966  -     Tar Girl
 1965  -     Time And Tide
 1964  -     The Tempest
 1963  -    Wenona Girl
 1962  -     Rush Bye
 1961  -     Gili
 1960  -     Olympiad
 1959  -     Huntly
 1958  -     Dubbo
 1957  -     My Kingdom
 1956  -     Apple Bay
 1955  -     Gay Vista
 1954  -     Tarien
 1953  -     Apex
 1952  -     True Leader
 1951  -     Donegal
 1950  -     San Domenico
 1949  -     San Domenico
 1948  -     Gay Monarch
 1947  -     Brazier
 1946  -     Felbeam
 1945  -     Felbeam
 1944  -     Yaralla
 1943  -     Gold Salute
 1942  -     High Caste
 1941  -    Caesar
 1940  -    High Caste
 1939  -    Bradford
 1938  -    Hammer Head
 1937  -    Silver Rose
 1936  -    Heritor
 1935  -    The Marne
 1934  -    Air Queen
 1933  -    Captivation
 1932  -    Golden Gate
 1931  -    Casque D'Or
 1930  -    Venetian Lady
 1929  -    Whitta
 1928  -    Greenline
 1927  -    Don Moon
 1926  -    Quixotic
 1925  -    The Hawk 
 1924  -    Laneffe
 1923  -    Duke Isinglass
 1922  -    Sir Maitland
 1921  -    Maltgilla
 1920  -    Aries
 1919  -    Sydney Damsel
 1918  -    Bonnie Plume
 1917  -    Wedding Day
 1916  -    Quinn's Post
 1915  -    Ninfia
 1914  -    Golden Hop
 1913  -    Golden Hop
 1912  -    Pride Of Murillo
 1911  -    Poi Dance
 1910  -    Fille Fogi
 1909  -    Neith
 1908  -    Lord Merv
 1907  -    Queen's Court
 1906  -    The Pet 

† Dead heat

See also
 List of Australian Group races
 Group races

External links 
Challenge Stakes (ATC)

References

Horse races in Australia